The 1985 All-Ireland Minor Hurling Championship was the 55th staging of the All-Ireland Minor Hurling Championship since its establishment by the Gaelic Athletic Association in 1928. The championship began on 24 April 1985 and ended on 1 September 1985.

Limerick entered the championship as the defending champions, however, they were beaten by Cork in the Munster semi-final.

On 1 September 1985, Cork won the championship following a 3-10 to 0-12 defeat of Wexford in the All-Ireland final. This was their 15th All-Ireland title and their first in six championship seasons.

Wexford's Vinny Murphy was the championship's top scorer with 2-36.

Results

Leinster Minor Hurling Championship

First round

Semi-finals

Final

Munster Minor Hurling Championship

First round

Semi-finals

Finals

Ulster Minor Hurling Championship

Semi-final

Final

All-Ireland Minor Hurling Championship

Semi-finals

Final

Championship statistics

Top scorers

Overall

References

External links
 All-Ireland Minor Hurling Championship: Roll Of Honour

Minor
All-Ireland Minor Hurling Championship